Ajayi Crowther University also known as ACU is a private university located in Oyo, Oyo State, Nigeria.

Historical background
The Ajayi Crowther University, Oyo was established by the Supra Diocesan Board (West) of the Church of Nigeria (Anglican Communion), has its origins in the defunct CMS* training institution, Abeokuta and the defunct St. Andrews College, Oyo.

 CMS (Christian Missionary Society)

The University started as CMS Training Institution in Abeokuta in 1853 from where it was relocated to Lagos (1868 to 1896). In March 1896, it was transplanted to Oyo retrospectively in 1920.
At inception, St. Andrews College, Oyo produced holders of Grade II Teachers Certificate while the Divinity Course for training church ministers was added to the curriculum between 1910 and 1942, and the proprietorship of the College was transferred from CMS, London to the Church of Nigeria (Anglican Communion).

In 1977, Government took over the control and administration of all schools in the Nigerian Federation and with this development, the Church of Nigeria was divested of her Proprietorship of the College. However, the St. Andrews College Old Boys Association (SACOBA) interest and by extension that of the Church, in the growth and development of St. Andrews did not wane. Thus, in response to SACOBA's petition, the erstwhile Oyo State Government upgraded the Institution to NCE campus in 1980 and to the full-fledged College of Education in 1985.

On 7 September 1999, the Church of Nigeria granted SACOBA's request for the establishment of Ajayi Crowther University, Oyo at the site of the former St. Andrews College, Oyo under the proprietorship of the Church. Having satisfied the rigorous criteria prescribed by the National Universities Commission (NUC) for the establishment of Universities in Nigeria, Ajayi Crowther University (ACU) was granted the license to operate as a Private University in Nigeria on 7 January 2005.

The University is named after the late Samuel Ajayi Crowther, the first African Bishop who first translated the bible into Yoruba. His Episcopal Ministry covered the entire West African sub-continent.
The former Vice-Chancellor of ACU  is Rt. Rev. Prof. Dapo Folorunsho Asaju. His wife's name is Barr. Mrs. Harriet Asaju. His tenure was from 2015-2020. During his tenure, Ajayi Crowther witnessed tremendous growth as more faculties were incorporated into the institution. More courses were also approved by  NUC.

List of Courses Offered in Ajayi Crowther University 
·        Accountancy / Finance / Accounting

·        Accounting

·        Actuarial Science

·        Agriculture

·        Architecture

·        Banking and Finance

·        Biochemistry

·        Business Administration

·        Business Education

·        Chemistry

·        Christian Studies

·        Civil Engineering

·        Computer Engineering

·        Computer Science

·        Economics

·        Education and Computer Science

·        Education and Economics

·        Education and English Language

·        Electrical / Electronic Engineering

·        English Language

·        Entrepreneurship

·        Estate Management

·        Geology

·        Guidance and Counseling

·        History and International Studies

·        Industrial Chemistry

·        Industrial Relations and Personnel Management

·        Law

·        Library and Information Science

·        Mass Communication

·        Mathematics

·        Mechanical Engineering

·        Medical Laboratory Science

·        Microbiology

·        Music

.          Nursing
         
·        Performing Arts

·        Physics with Electronics

·        Political Science
         Radiography & Radiation science

·        Statistics

·        Teacher Education Science

·        Actuarial Science and Insurance

·        Christian Religious Studies (CRS)

·        Radiography And Radiation Science

References
 
Economic Department 2015/2016

External links
Ajayi Crowther University Official Website

Universities and colleges in Nigeria
Christian universities and colleges in Nigeria
2005 establishments in Nigeria
Private universities and colleges in Nigeria
Academic libraries in Nigeria